Tímea Babos and Kristina Mladenovic were the defending champions, but chose not to compete together. Babos played alongside Julia Görges, but lost in the semifinals to Caroline Garcia and Mladenovic.
Chuang Chia-jung and Darija Jurak won the title, defeating Garcia and Mladenovic in the final, 6–4, 6–4.

Seeds

Draw

References
Main Draw

Dubai Doubles
2016 Dubai Tennis Championships